Lee Magid (born Leon Magid; April 6, 1926 – March 31, 2007) was an American rhythm and blues producer and manager, who worked with artists such as Clara Ward, Al Hibbler, Sam Fletcher, and Della Reese. 

Steve Kurutz of Allmusic described Magid as an "old-time record hustler [who] held a position in nearly every facet of the industry at one time or another."

Life and career
Born in New York City to a Jewish family, Magid started playing trumpet and preparing arrangements in his teens, and worked as a song plugger. Around 1945, he started working for Al Green, owner of National Records. Recognizing Magid's ability to place R&B records on white radio stations, Green soon promoted him to an A&R position.  Majid also started producing recordings with musicians such as Big Joe Turner, Charlie Ventura, and the Ward Singers.

Feeling that his creative input was constrained by Green's tight budgetary control, Magid moved to Herman Lubinsky's Savoy label, and continued to produce records, working with engineer Tom Dowd. As producer, songwriter, and A&R man, and working with others including Ralph Bass, Magid found commercial success with Johnny Otis and Little Esther.  

In 1953, Magid signed singer Al Hibbler, soon becoming his manager and securing his record deal with Decca Records. Increasingly taking on the duties of manager rather than producer, Magid also discovered and managed Della Reese, and later managed Lou Rawls, Earl Grant and Sam Fletcher, among others.

In addition to his work as producer and manager, Magid also worked as a club owner, music publisher, and lyricist, and was involved in the careers of T-Bone Walker, Marian McPartland, O.C. Smith, Eddie “Cleanhead” Vinson, and Marlena Shaw, among others.  During the 1980s and 1990s he was the manager of gospel star Tramaine Hawkins and jazz crossover electric violinist Marius Kahan.

Magid died in Malibu, California on March 31, 2007; he was survived by his four children: Diane Magid, Deborah Magid Kagay, Adam Magid and Andrea Magid Hall Phinney.

References

Other sources
 Who's Who in America, 53rd edition, 1999, Marquis Who's Who, New Providence, NJ (1998)   
 Who's Who in America, 54th edition, 2000, Marquis Who's Who, New Providence, NJ (1999) 
 Who's Who in America, 56th edition, 2002, Marquis Who's Who, New Providence, NJ (2001)         
 Who's Who in America, 57th edition, 2003, Marquis Who's Who, New Providence, NJ (2002)   
 Who's Who in Entertainment, Second edition, 1992–1993, Marquis Who's Who, Wilmette, IL (1992)   
 Who's Who in Entertainment, Third edition, 1998–1999, Marquis Who's Who, New Providence, NJ (1997)   
 Who's Who in the World, 16th edition, 1999, Marquis Who's Who, New Providence, NJ (1999)   

Record producers from California
20th-century American Jews
1926 births
2007 deaths
21st-century American Jews